The Buchberg is a wide cone-shaped mountain on the northern edge of the Zittau Mountains which is 652 m above sea level (NN). The Buchberg is entirely wooded. Whilst the mountain drops steeply to the east and north, it slopes away relatively gently to the south and west. South of the mountain is an area of raised bog which forms the source region of the Zwittebach.

Location and area 
The Buchberg rises west of the village of Jonsdorf and east of Waltersdorf. The road from Jonsdorf to Waltersdorf runs across the northern slopes of the mountain.

Routes to the top 
 The peak may be ascended from hiking paths, most of which run from Jonsdorf in the general direction of the summit. No direct paths run over the summit itself.

References 

Mountains of Saxony
Zittau Mountains
Mountains under 1000 metres